Homoeomma is a genus of South American tarantulas that was first described by Anton Ausserer in 1871. It is considered a senior synonym of Calopelma, Butantania, and of Cyclothoracoides. These tarantulas are usually quite small and usually burrow a few centimeters under a rock or log.

Diagnosis
Males of this genus can be distinguished by the tile-like apophysis on the base of the palpal bulb, and the embolus being in an obtuse angle, in relation to the bulb. Males also have a flexion of the metatarsus 1, which is between the branches of the tibial apophysis. Females can be distinguished by the spermatheca morphology, which lacks constriction in the apex.

Species
 it contains thirteen species, found in South America:
Homoeomma brasilianum (Chamberlin, 1917) – Brazil
Homoeomma chilense Montenegro & Aguilera, 2018 – Chile
Homoeomma elegans (Gerschman & Schiapelli, 1958) – Argentina
Homoeomma familiare Bertkau, 1880 – Brazil
Homoeomma hirsutum (Mello-Leitão, 1935) – Brazil
Homoeomma montanum (Mello-Leitão, 1923) – Brazil
Homoeomma nigrum (Walckenaer, 1837) – Brazil
Homoeomma orellanai Montenegro & Aguilera, 2018 – Chile
Homoeomma peruvianum (Chamberlin, 1916) – Peru
Homoeomma strabo (Simon, 1892) – Colombia, Brazil
Homoeomma stradlingi O. Pickard-Cambridge, 1881 (type) – Brazil
Homoeomma uruguayense (Mello-Leitão, 1946) – Uruguay, Argentina
Homoeomma villosum (Keyserling, 1891) – Brazil

In synonymy
H. bicolor Sherwood, Gabriel & Longhorn, 2018 = Homoeomma chilense Montenegro & Aguilera, 2018
H. cyclothorax (Mello-Leitão, 1923) = Homoeomma montanum (Mello-Leitão, 1923)
H. moreirae (Mello-Leitão, 1923) = Homoeomma brasilianum (Chamberlin, 1917)
H. regina (Chamberlin, 1917) = Homoeomma strabo (Simon, 1892)
H. serratum (Gerschman & Schiapelli, 1958) = Homoeomma uruguayense (Mello-Leitão, 1946)

Transferred to other genera
Homoeomma alcirae Gerschman & Schiapelli, 1954 → Plesiopelma alcirae
Homoeomma humile Vellard, 1924 → Bumba humilis
Homoeomma pictum (Pocock, 1903) → Anqasha picta'Homoeomma simoni Soares & Camargo, 1948 → Catanduba simoni''

See also
 List of Theraphosidae species

References

Theraphosidae genera
Spiders of South America
Taxa named by Anton Ausserer
Theraphosidae